Kochkin is a rural locality (a khutor) in Pchegatlukayskoye Rural Settlement of Teuchezhsky District, the Republic of Adygea, Russia. The population was 10 as of 2018. There are 2 streets.

References 

Rural localities in Teuchezhsky District